"(What Did I Do to Be So) Black and Blue" is a 1929 jazz standard composed by Fats Waller with lyrics by Harry Brooks and Andy Razaf. It was introduced in the Broadway musical Hot Chocolates (1929) by Edith Wilson. In the show, Wilson originally sang the song from a bed with white sheets, but the bed was removed after the first show due to the judgement that it was too suggestive. The show also included Waller's hit compositions "Ain't Misbehavin'" and "Honeysuckle Rose".

Louis Armstrong later performed and recorded the song several times omitting the opening verse.

Blues singer Ethel Waters's 1930 version of the song became a hit, and the song has been recorded by many artists since then.

Frankie Laine's 1946 version was featured in the 2011 video game L.A. Noire, as part of the in-game radio station, K.T.I. Radio.

The song is also featured in the prologue of Ralph Ellison's novel Invisible Man (1952) as its protagonist, while hiding underground in a basement with 1369 light bulbs, listens to the song being played by Armstrong and contemplates the "horrors of slavery" while smoking a reefer.

In 1978, the song was included in the hit Broadway revue Ain't Misbehavin' a tribute to Fats Waller and the vibrancy of the early years of jazz in America. The dramatic, layered vocal arrangement and orchestration by Luther Henderson showcased all five members of the company and reintroduced the piece to a new generation of theatergoers. The musical was recorded by RCA Victor.  In 1980, Edith Wilson reprised the song to enthusiastic New York audiences at Town Hall as part of the off-Broadway revue, Black Broadway.

Notes
The song is also featured in the prologue of "Springfield Had No Shame: The Springfield Race Riot of 1908 Part Three". The song is performed by Springfield native Johnny Thompson.

See also
List of 1920s jazz standards

1929 songs
1920s jazz standards
Songs written by Andy Razaf
Songs with music by Fats Waller